Saxmundham is a market town in Suffolk, England, set in the valley of the River Fromus about  north-east of Ipswich and  west of the coast at Sizewell. The town is bypassed by the main A12 road between London and Lowestoft. The town is served by Saxmundham railway station on the East Suffolk Line between Ipswich and Lowestoft.

Governance
Saxmundham Town Council comes under East Suffolk District. It was previously in Suffolk Coastal District before April 2019. The district electoral ward also has the name Saxmundham. Its population at the 2011 census was 4,913.

As of December 2022, Saxmundham Town Council consisted of ten councillors.

Heritage
The place-name Saxmundham is first attested in the Domesday Book of 1086 as Sasmunde(s)ham. It appears as Saxmundham in the Feet of Fines of 1213. The name denotes "Seaxmund's village or estate".

The Parish Church of St John the Baptist dates back to the 11th century. Some features remain from the medieval period, but its present appearance owes most to the 19th century. Much of the church's official architectural guide, with accounts of its medieval remnants, can be read on the Town Council site.

Facilities
Saxmundham has facilities for overnight, bed-and-breakfast and camping accommodation.

It has had a market charter since at least 1272, and holds a market every Wednesday in the Market Place just off the High Street, with indoor and outdoor stalls.

Notable residents
With a Wikipedia page, in birth order:
John Shipp (1784–1834), army officer, was born in Saxmundham. His military memoirs were widely read in the 19th century.
Henry Bright (1810–1873), painter
Thomas Thurlow (1813–1899), sculptor
Hamlet Watling (1818–1908), archaeologist, illustrator and schoolmaster
Bernard Collins (1880–1951), county cricketer, also wrote a book on life after death: Death is Not the End (London: Psychic Press, 1939).
Buck Read (1880–1970), American basketball coach, was born in Saxmundham.
Herbert Heyner (1882–1954), baritone, died here.
Eleanor Berwick (born 1943), wine-grower
Maggi Hambling (born 1945), artist, has lived in a cottage near Saxmundham since the mid-1980s.
Sam Miller (born 1962) works as a television director.
Ray Allen (born 1975), NBA All-Star, spent some childhood years in Saxmundham.

In fiction

Brother Eadulf has become Saxmundham's most famous international fictional character, through the best-selling Sister Fidelma mysteries by Peter Tremayne (a pseudonym of the Celtic scholar and author Peter Berresford Ellis). Brother Eadulf, as companion and assistant to Sister Fidelma, often plays a crucial part in resolving the mystery. He is introduced as originally the hereditary gerefa (magistrate) of "Seaxmund's Ham in the land of the South Folk." He attends the famous Synod of Whitby in AD 664 and joins Sister Fidelma in solving a murder of one of the delegates (Absolution by Murder, 1994). He has since appeared in most of the novels and some of the short stories, although the Saxmundham area has been used as a setting in only one of the novels: The Haunted Abbot (2002). Tremayne chose Saxmundham as Eadulf's place of origin because of local connections, the nearness of the town to an ancient royal burial site of the East Angles, and the historic East Anglian connections with Irish Christian missionaries. He appears in all but two of the Sister Fidelma series of mystery novels, set in 7th century Ireland.

The series has now reached 31 published titles, appearing in a score of languages. An International Sister Fidelma Society, devoted to the author and his work, has existed for 20 years and publishes a 20-page colour magazine three times a year.

See also
SET Saxmundham School
Saxmundham railway station

References

External links

Saxmundham Town Council website
The Saxmundham & District Community Interest Company
Saxmundham businesses website
PASTEL
Saxmundham Community
Henry Bright, Norwich School of Painters — Saxmundham Website
The International Sister Fidelma Society 

 
Market towns in Suffolk
Towns in Suffolk
Civil parishes in Suffolk